Ecsenius bimaculatus, known commonly as the twinspot coralblenny, is a species of marine fish in the family Blenniidae.

The twinspot coralblenny is widespread throughout the tropical waters of the western Pacific Ocean and particularly in the Philippines and the northeast of Borneo, which is the Malaysian province of Sabah.

It occasionally makes its way into the aquarium trade.

References

External links
http://www.marinespecies.org/aphia.php?p=taxdetails&id=277653
 

bimaculatus
Taxa named by Victor G. Springer
Fish described in 1971